Male contraceptives, also known as male birth control, are methods of preventing pregnancy that solely involve the male physiology. The most common kinds of male contraception include condoms, outercourse, and  vasectomy. In domestic animals, castration is commonly used for contraception. Other forms of male contraception are in various stages of research and development. These include methods like RISUG/VasalGel (which has completed a small phase II clinical trial in humans in India) and ultrasound (with results so far obtained in experimental animals).

Methods

Surgery
Vasectomy is a surgical procedure for male sterilization or permanent birth control. During the procedure, the vasa deferentia of a man are severed, and then tied or sealed to prevent sperm from entering into the seminal stream (ejaculate). Vasectomies are usually performed in a physician's office or medical clinic. CDC research has estimated there is a probability of 11 failures per 1,000 procedures over 2 years; half of the failures occurred in the first three months after the vasectomy, and no failures occurred after 72 weeks. Due to the presence of sperm retained beyond the blocked vasa deferentia, vasectomies only become effective about three months following the operation. With perfect use, the Pearl Index is 0.1. With typical use, it is 0.15.

Condoms
A condom is a sheath-shaped barrier device that may be used during sexual intercourse to reduce the probability of pregnancy. It is rolled onto an erect penis before intercourse and blocks ejaculated semen from entering the sexual partner's reproductive system.
With perfect use, the pregnancy rate of condoms is 2% and the Pearl Index is 3. With typical use, it is 14. Condoms may be combined with other forms of contraception (such as spermicide) for greater protection. The typical use pregnancy rate among condom users varies depending on the population being studied, ranging from 10 to 18%.

Withdrawal
The withdrawal method is a behavior that involves halting penile-vaginal intercourse to remove the penis out and away from the vagina prior to ejaculation. Pulling out is a popular contraceptive behavior that many couples use because of convenience, dissatisfaction with other methods, it's free of expense, and has constant availability. Failure rate varies with population  studied, but withdrawal is overall not considered to be efficacious enough to be the sole method of pregnancy prevention being utilized. The accepted rate of failure is about 4% with perfect use at every act of intercourse, but the failure rate with typical use ranges in between 18% and 27% With perfect use, the Pearl Index of this method is 1 to 9. With typical use, it is 20.

Retrograde ejaculation
Intentional retrograde ejaculation (coitus saxonicus) is a primitive form of male birth control. It involves squeezing the urethra at the base or applying pressure to the perineum during orgasm. However, the practice is not considered a reliable method compared to most modern types of birth control.

Natural methods: hormonal and thermal 
 A contraceptive threshold has been defined for men in 2007. Whether using the thermal or hormonal method, this threshold amounts to 1 million spermatozoa per milliliter in one ejaculate. Out of the 50 couples that were observed over 537 cycles, only one pregnancy occurred due to poor use of the method. The Pearl Index would thus be lower than 0.5 and this contraception method can be considered efficient according to the WHO standards.

Heat-based contraception implies keeping testicles over 37°C, and is also called the thermal method. It consists in slightly raising the temperature of the testicles by exposing them to the heat of the body. One way of applying it involves wearing special underwear. A group in France called Collectif Thomas Bouloù have been testing it intensively for a few years. Over a thousand men are currently using the thermal method in France. With perfect use, its Pearl Index is 0.6. With typical use, it is 0.8.

History
Dioscorides, ca. 40 A.D., described the contraceptive property of hemp seeds (Cannabis sativa) and rue (Ruta graveolens) in De Materia Medica, a text widely used into medieval times.  One test in rats (20 milligrams of the 80% ethanol extract) found that these reduced sperm count by more than half.  In medieval Persia (and in other traditions as cited) these herbs were used for male contraception, as well as Gossypium herbaceum (Malvaceae), Cyperus longus (Cyperaceae), Vitex pseudonegundo (Verbenaceae), Chenopodium ambrosioides (Chenopodiaceae), Aristolochia indica (Aristolochiaceae), Punica granatum (Punicaceae), and Sarcostemma acidum (Asclepiadaceae).  However, the compound isolated from Gossypium, as well as other cotton seeds and okra (gossypol) has been abandoned for contraceptive use because it was found to cause permanent infertility in ten to twenty percent of users.

In Indian traditional medicine, uses of the neem tree were described in Ayurvedic medicine, by Sushruta and in the Rasarathasamucchaya, Sarangadhara, Bhavaprakasha and Bhisagya Ratnavali.  Held traditionally to have antifertility effects, its leaves were demonstrated to reduce pregnancy rate and litter size in a test of male rats.

In 2002, researchers fed extracts from the seeds of papaya fruits (Carica papaya) to monkeys. Subsequently, the monkeys had no sperm in their ejaculate. Traditionally used for contraception, papaya seeds had no apparent ill effects on the testes or other organs of rats tested with a long-term treatment.

Heat-based contraception, dating in concept to the writings of Hippocrates, involves heating the testicles to prevent the formation of sperm.

Research
A goal of research is to develop a reversible male contraceptive, either pharmaceutical, surgical or other.

Medications 
Two delivery methods are currently under active study: male contraceptives that can be taken in pill form by mouth, similar to the existing birth control pill for women and male injections.

 Non-hormonal oral medications based on extracts and derivatives of Tripterygium wilfordii (雷公籐, lei gong teng), a plant used in Traditional Chinese Medicine, were studied clinically from the mid-1980s to mid-1990s. In 2021, a trial published in Nature Communications showed that one derivative, triptonide, was safe, effective, and reversible in laboratory mice and monkeys.
 Gossypol, an extract of cotton, has been studied as a male contraceptive pill. It decreased sperm production; however this is permanent in 20% of people.
 Inhibition of chromatin remodeling by binding to a pocket on BRDT has been shown to produce reversible sterility in male mice. JQ1, a selective BRDT inhibitor which acts in this manner, is currently under development as a non-hormonal male contraceptive drug. It effectively blocks the production of sperm by the testes, and lacks the adverse effects of previously researched hormonal contraceptives for men.
 Immunocontraception targeting sperm antigens has been found to be effective in male primates.
 Calcium channel blockers such as nifedipine may cause reversible infertility by altering the lipid metabolism of sperm so that they are not able to fertilize an egg. Recent Research at Israel's Bar-Ilan University show that as of June 2010, such a pill may be five years away. Testing it on mice has been found to be effective, with no side effects.
 BMS-189453, a compound that interferes with the vitamin A pathway has been shown to render male mice sterile for the course of the treatment without affecting libido.  Once taken off the compound, the mice continued to make sperm. The mechanism of action includes blocking the conversion of vitamin A into its active form retinoic acid which binds to retinoic receptors which is needed to initiate sperm production. This can be done, for instance, by blocking an aldehyde dehydrogenase called RALDH3 (ALDH1A2), which converts retinaldehyde into retionic acid in testes. Past attempts to do this failed because the blocking compounds were not sufficiently specific and also blocked other aldehyde dehydrogenases, such as those responsible for the alcohol metabolism, causing serious side effects. Another way is blocking retionic receptors themselves, although it can also have serious side effects.
 Adjudin, a non-toxic analog of lonidamine has been shown to cause reversible infertility in rats. The drug disrupts the junctions between nurse cells (Sertoli cells) in the testes and forming spermatids. The sperm are released prematurely and never become functional gametes. A new targeted delivery mechanism has made Adjudin much more effective.
Gamendazole, a derivative of lonidamine, shows semi-reversible infertility in rats. The mechanism of action is thought to be disruption of Sertoli cell function, resulting in decreased levels of inhibin B.
 Multiple male hormonal contraceptive protocols have been developed. One is a combination protocol, involving injections of Depo-Provera to prevent spermatogenesis, combined with the topical application of testosterone gel to provide hormonal support. A similar proposal consists of yearly subdermal implant administering a synthetic testosterone compound (7α-methyl-19-nortestosterone) combined with regular injections of Depo-Provera. The implant alone (without Depo-Provera injections) has been shown to already sufficiently reduce sperm count in most of the subjects given the highest tested dosage in a Phase II trial. Another is a monthly injection of testosterone undecanoate, which recently performed very well in a Phase III trial in China.
 Phenoxybenzamine has been found to block ejaculation, which gives it the potential to be an effective contraceptive.  Studies have found that the quality of the semen is unaffected and the results are reversible by simply discontinuing the treatment.
 Trestolone is an anabolic steroid that has been shown to significantly reduce sperm count.
 A male birth control pill based on ouabain, a plant extract used by traditional African hunters to stop the hearts of game, has been shown to reduce sperm motility sufficiently for effective contraception in rats.
Dimethandrolone undecanoate, or DMAU is currently being tested as a new male birth control pill. This experimental male oral contraceptive is a male hormone like testosterone, and a progestin. Currently conducting research on this new medication is Stephanie Page, M.D., PhD, professor of medicine at the University of Washington, Seattle, Wash and co-author Christina Wang, M.D. Their study consists of 100 healthy men between the ages 18 to 50 years. They tested three different doses of DMAU (100, 200, and 400 milligrams) for 28 days. Each dosage group included five participants who receive an inactive placebo and 12 to 15 men who received DMAU.   The results of the study were reported promising by Stephanie Page, M.D., PhD and co-author Christina Wang, M.D. A total of 83 men completed the study and successfully provided the researchers with blood and cholesterol samples. The participants in the dosage group with the highest dose of DMAU tested, 400 mg, showed "marked suppression" of testosterone levels and two hormones involved in sperm production.   "Despite having low levels of circulating testosterone, very few subjects reported symptoms consistent with testosterone deficiency or excess," Page reported.  Overall, all participants in their study experienced weight gain and a decrease in HDL cholesterol. All subjects passed safety tests involving liver and kidney function.  "These promising results are unprecedented in the development of a prototype male pill," Page said. "Longer term studies are currently under way to confirm that DMAU taken every day blocks sperm production."
YCT529, a Vitamin A receptor antagonist, is in early stage human clinical trials as a male contraceptive after promising results in mice.
Soluble adenylyl cyclase inhibition has been demonstrated to temporarily reduce male fertility in mice.

Surgical methods 
 RISUG consists of injecting a polymer gel, styrene maleic anhydride in dimethyl sulfoxide, into the vas deferens. The polymer has a positive charge, and when negatively charged sperm pass through the vas deferens, the charge differential severely damages the sperm. A second injection washes out the substance and restores fertility. , RISUG is in Phase III of human testing in India and has been patented in India, China, Bangladesh and the United States. Vasalgel is a brand name of polymer gel injection that is being tested in the United States. Testing on rabbits and primates showed positive results.
 Vas-occlusive contraception consists of partially or completely blocking the vas deferens, the tubes connecting the epididymis to the urethra.  While a vasectomy removes a piece of each vas deferens, the intra vas device (IVD) and other injectable plugs only block the tubes until the devices are removed. The U.S. Food and Drug Administration (FDA) approved human clinical trials for the intra-vas device in 2006.

Other
 Research on the safety and effectiveness of using ultrasound treatments to kill sperm has undergone since the idea originally came about following experiments in the 1970s by Mostafa S. Fahim who noticed ultrasound killed microbes and decreased fertility. As of 2012 a study conducted on rats found that two 15-minute treatments of ultrasound delivered 2 days apart in a warm salt bath effectively lowered their sperm count to below fertile levels. Another small study involved dogs, and found that after three ultrasound applications the dogs' ejaculate contained no sperm. Further experiments on its effectiveness on humans, the longevity of the results, and its safety have yet to be conducted.

Abandoned research
 Miglustat (Zavesca or NB-DNJ) is a drug approved for treatment of several rare lipid storage disorder diseases.  In mice, it provided effective and fully reversible contraception.  But it seems this effect was only true for several genetically related strains of laboratory mice. Miglustat showed no contraceptive effect in other mammals.
 Silodosin, an α1-adrenoceptor antagonist with high uroselectivity, approved by the FDA to treat Benign Prostatic Hyperplasia (BPH), has been shown to decrease sperm count when taken in at 5 times normal doses.

Impact 
It is predicted that introduction of a long-acting reversible contraception for males could decrease the rate of unintended pregnancy.

References 

https://www.sciencedaily.com/releases/2021/08/210826170228.htm

External links

Male Contraceptive Initiative
Male Contraception Information Project